The malinda apple is a cultivar of domesticated apple, originating in New England., most likely Vermont.

The Malinda's importance in other apples

Malinda genes, whether as a parent, grandparent, or great-grandparent, led to all of

 Chestnut Crab,
 Folwell,
 Haralson,
 Beacon,
 Honeygold,
 Honeycrisp,
 Keepsake
 Minnehaha,
 MN 1606, and
 Sweet Sixteen

The flavor of the Malinda Apple

The flavor of a Malinda is akin to the taste of pears.

References

Apple cultivars